Frank Sánchez Faure (born 18 July 1992) is a Cuban professional boxer who has held the NABO heavyweight title since 2019 and the WBC Continental Americas heavyweight title since 2020.

Professional career
Sánchez made his professional debut on 22 September 2017, scoring a first-round technical knockout (TKO) victory against Justin Thornton at the Mel Ott Recreation Center in Gretna, Louisiana.

After winning his first six fights, all by stoppage, he faced Lamont Capers on 4 May 2018. Capers received a point deduction in the first round for excessive holding before the contest was halted in the second round after Capers was shoved through the ropes and out of the ring. With capers not able to continue, the bout was scored a no contest (NC).

Following six more wins, four by stoppage, Sánchez faced Victor Bisbal for the vacant WBO-NABO heavyweight title on 31 August 2019 at the Minneapolis Armory in Minneapolis, Minnesota. Sánchez defeated Bisbal via fourth-round corner retirement (RTD) after Bisbal's corner informed referee Celestino Ruiz that Bisbal was unwilling to continue before the start of the fifth round. After Efe Ajagba pulled out of a bout with Jack Mulowayi due to a back injury sustained during training, Sánchez was brought in as a late replacement. The bout took place on 26 October at the Santander Arena in Reading, Pennsylvania. Sánchez won a shutout unanimous decision (UD) to capture the vacant WBO-NABO title for a second time, with all three judges scoring the bout 100–90. His next fight came against Joey Dawejko for the vacant WBC Continental Americas heavyweight title on 7 March 2020 at the Barclays Center in New York City. Sánchez captured his second professional title via UD over ten rounds, with two judges scoring the bout 100–90 and the third scoring it 98–92.

Following his win against Dawejko, Sánchez recorded back-to-back knockout wins against Brian Howard and Julian Fernandez, before facing Nagy Aguilera on the undercard of Canelo Álvarez vs. Billy Joe Saunders on 8 May 2021. Sánchez won the bout by unanimous technical decision after six rounds, after Aguilera told officials that he was not able to continue after an unintentional foul.

Sánchez faced undefeated Efe Ajagba on 9 October 2021 on the undercard of Tyson Fury vs. Deontay Wilder III. Sánchez knocked down Ajagba en route to a unanimous decision victory, with scores of 98–91, 98–91 and 97–92.

Sánchez was expected to face Carlos Negrón on 1 January 2022, on the undercard of the Luis Ortiz and Charles Martin heavyweight bout. It was announced on 28 December 2021 that Negrón had withdrawn from the bout due to a positive COVID-19 test, and would be replaced by Christian Hammer. Sánchez won the fight by unanimous decision. He was awarded every single round of the fight, and scored a debatable knockdown in the tenth round.

Professional boxing record

References

Living people
1992 births
Cuban male boxers
Sportspeople from Guantánamo
Heavyweight boxers
21st-century Cuban people